East Rockingham Waste to Energy is a waste-to-energy power station under construction located in East Rockingham, Western Australia.

Background
At the time of project approval, Australia generated 23 million tonnes of waste to landfill every year, with the state of Western Australia having the lowest waste recovery and highest waste generation rate per capita in the country. The geography of Perth, situated on a sandy coastal plain and relying heavily on groundwater as a source of potable water, meant new landfill sites were unlikely to be approved in the metropolitan region and existing ones were nearing capacity. As a consequence, the Government of Western Australia encouraged local councils to end their dependency on landfills by the year 2020 as the practice was not sustainable.

Overview
East Rockingham Waste to Energy, at the time of construction approval in January 2020, was the second approved waste-to-energy plant in Australia. The facility is intended to take waste otherwise destined for landfill from the Cities of Cockburn, Belmont, Kalamunda and Swan as well as the Shire of Mundaring.

The facility is jointly financed and owned by British company John Laing Group, Acciona Concesiones, Hitachi Zosen Inova as well as Masdar Tribe Energy, a subsidiary of Mubadala Investment Company.

As a waste produced, the facility will create  of bottom ash annually, which is destined for use as construction material.

Construction of the facility is scheduled to employ 300 people, while operation will employ 50. Construction of the facility, which began in May 2020, received A$18 million in federal funding from the Australian Renewable Energy Agency as well as A$57.5 million in subordinated debt from the Federal government's Clean Energy Finance Corporation.

The facility is contracted to be operated and maintained by French company Suez once completed, with completion originally scheduled for late 2022. In late 2022 it was announced that the completion of the project had been delayed until 2023.

Located on a  site, the East Rockingham Waste to Energy facility will include a bottom ash treatment plant as part of the requirement to achieve the required landfill diversion.

References

External links
 East Rockingham Waste to Energy Facility Revised Proposal Environmental Protection Authority (Government of Western Australia)

Power stations in Western Australia
Waste power stations in Australia
Buildings and structures in Perth, Western Australia
East Rockingham, Western Australia